WIXIW (pronounced "wish you") is the sixth studio album by experimental rock trio Liars, released on June 4, 2012. It was written in Los Angeles and in a remote cabin in the mountains around the city. Recording took place in Liars’ private studio below U.S. Highway 101 in Los Angeles under the guidance of the band's label boss, Daniel Miller. Writing for The Quietus, Luke Turner described WIXIW as the band's "most accessible album to date" as well as their most electronic record ever. Reflecting on WIXIWs themes of longing and doubt, Angus Andrew said "You find that throughout the record, even within single songs, there's this duality of wanting to be close to someone but at the same time being afraid of that and thinking it's best that they leave."

The video for "Brats" by Ian Cheng was the second featured video on Cartoon Network's Adult Swim series Off the Air in the episode "Nature".

Critical reception

WIXIW was well received by music critics, and garnered a score of 81 on the review site Metacritic, indicating "universal acclaim."

In a review for BBC Music, John Doran called the album an "unqualified success" and suggested Liars' newfound kinship with Aphex Twin and Radiohead circa 1999 established them in a field all their own, while Turner referred to the song Brats as a "juddering drunk punk masterpiece." Journalist Emily Mackay of the NME likened the palindromatic album title to the band pursuing a new creative approach to reconnect with their multi-faceted essential nature.

Accolades

Track listing

References

Liars (band) albums
2012 albums
Mute Records albums